Punamyocera is a genus of parasitic flies in the family Tachinidae. There is one described species in Punamyocera, P. oroyensis.

Distribution
Peru

References

Dexiinae
Diptera of North America
Tachinidae genera
Monotypic Brachycera genera
Taxa named by Charles Henry Tyler Townsend